The Bank of Taiwan Building is located at No. 16, The Bund, Shanghai, China. The Japanese Empire occupied Taiwan in 1895, and in 1899 founded the Bank of Taiwan to promote trade between Taiwan, the Japanese Empire, and the rest of Asia. The bank then began opening offices outside of Taiwan in order to facilitate inter-regional trade.

The present building was completed in 1924, and replaced an earlier building on the site. Its architecture combines both Western and Japanese elements. The building is now a branch of China Merchants Bank.

References

Bibliography
 Shea, Marilyn. "The Bund - Picture Guide to Historic Buildings" . The University of Maine. 2007. Retrieved September 22, 2012.

Bank buildings in China
Buildings and structures in Shanghai
Office buildings completed in 1924
The Bund
China–Japan relations
Neoclassical architecture in China